Fordham High School for the Arts, often called simply Fordham Arts, is a small school located within Roosevelt Educational Campus, the site of the former Theodore Roosevelt High School, across the street from Fordham University. It was established in 2002 and is part of the New York City Department of Education.

FHSA specializes in the arts, with a curriculum that emphasizes dance, music, theater, and visual arts. In addition to traditional academic classes, FHSA offers a variety of arts classes. Dance classes include ballet, modern dance, and jazz, while music classes include chorus, band, and orchestra. Theater classes cover acting, stagecraft, and playwriting, and visual arts classes include drawing, painting, and sculpture.

References
Notes

External links
 Fordham Arts (DOE website)
 Listing on insideschools.org

Public high schools in the Bronx
Belmont, Bronx